Ben Vishala Thapa (born 2 March 1982) is an English opera singer, best known as the low tenor in G4 from 2004 to 2018.

Born in Cambridge, Thapa was raised by a single mother from the age of four after his father left, and entered foster care when he was eleven. It was during this time Thapa started singing lessons and sang in his local church choir, and played the clarinet in an orchestra while at Hills Road Sixth Form College. He studied at Royal Northern College of Music for a year before transferring to the Guildhall School of Music and Drama where he graduated from in 2004. Thapa graduated from the Wales International Academy of Voice in 2013.

While completing his course at Guildhall, Thapa auditioned for the first series of The X Factor with his G4 bandmates Jon Ansell, Matt Stiff, and Mike Christie where they reached the final but lost out to Steve Brookstein. Due to their popularity on the show they were soon approached by Sony BMG, and the group released three albums. As he had perfect pitch, Thapa's other role in G4 was ensuring that the other members were in the right key during their performances. The group split in 2007. However, after a seven-year hiatus, G4 reunited for a reunion concert at the Barbican Hall, and announced their 2015 reunion tour. Ben continued touring and recording with G4 until April 2018. Then on 19 July he announced on social media that he was leaving G4 with immediate effect to concentrate on his solo Operatic career.

Thapa has worked with the National Chamber Choir of Ireland, released the album Songs of My Childhood, and embarked on a nationwide tour. Thapa has also sung in numerous opera productions, including the Scottish Opera's Kátya Kabanová.

References

External links
G4 section at The ClassicalX

1982 births
Alumni of the Guildhall School of Music and Drama
G4 (group) members
Living people
English people of Indian descent
People from Cambridge